Douglas Arnott (born 5 August 1964 in Lanark) is a Scottish former footballer who played as a striker. Arnott's career began at Pollok at the Scottish Junior level, before spending his entire senior football career at Motherwell, spending twelve seasons with the Fir Park club before retiring due to an injury in 1998. In 1990–91, Arnott was part of Motherwell's Scottish Cup-winning side, which was his only senior honour.

On 11 September 2008, Arnott's belated testimonial match went ahead against an Old Firm select. Other players lined up for Arnott's side included former goalkeeper Sieb Dijkstra and defenders Chris McCart and Fraser Wishart, while the Old Firm team included Ally McCoist and Gordon Durie. The Old Firm side won 5–4, in a game which saw Arnott score the first of the match, and Ally McCoist net a hat-trick.

Retirement
Since retiring from football, Arnott has purchased a number of pubs, including "The Wee Thackit" in Carluke.

Honours
 Scottish Cup: 1
 1990–91

References

External links
 

1964 births
Sportspeople from Lanark
Living people
Scottish footballers
Scottish Football League players
Pollok F.C. players
Motherwell F.C. players
Association football forwards
Footballers from South Lanarkshire
Scottish Junior Football Association players